The cyclometer  was a cryptologic device designed, "probably in 1934 or 1935," by Marian Rejewski of the Polish Cipher Bureau's German section (BS-4) to facilitate  decryption of German Enigma ciphertext.  The original machines are believed to have been destroyed shortly before the German invasion of Poland that launched the Second World War, to prevent the Germans learning that their cipher had been broken.  

Using drawings made by Rejewski, Hal Evans and Tim Flack at the Department of Engineering, University of Cambridge, in 2019 constructed a working version of the cyclometer.

History

Example message

Frode Weierud provides the procedure, secret settings, and results that were used in a 1930 German technical manual.

Daily key (shared secret):
  Wheel Order  : II  I  III
  Ringstellung : 24  13  22 (XMV)
  Reflector    : A
  Plugboard    : A-M, F-I, N-V, P-S, T-U, W-Z
  Grundstellung: FOL

Operator chosen message key : ABL
Enciphered starting with FOL: PKPJXI

Cleartext message to send and resulting cleartext:
  Feindliche Infanteriekolonne beobachtet.
  Anfang Südausgang Bärwalde.
  Ende drei km ostwärts Neustadt.

  FEIND LIQEI NFANT ERIEK 
  OLONN EBEOB AQTET XANFA 
  NGSUE DAUSG ANGBA ERWAL 
  DEXEN DEDRE IKMOS TWAER 
  TSNEU STADT

Resulting message:
  1035 – 90 – 341 – 
  PKPJX IGCDS EAHUG WTQGR
  KVLFG XUCAL XVYMI GMMNM
  FDXTG NVHVR MMEVO UYFZS
  LRHDR RXFJW CFHUH MUNZE
  FRDIS IKBGP MYVXU Z

The first line of the message is not encrypted. The "1035" is the time, "90" is number of characters encrypted under the message key, and "341" is a system indicator that tells the recipient how the message was encrypted (i.e., using Enigma with a certain daily key). The first six letters in the body ("PKPJXI") are the doubled key ("ABLABL") encrypted using the daily key settings and starting the encryption at the ground setting/Grundstellung "FOL". The recipient would decipher the first six letters to recover the message key ("ABL"); he would then set the machine's rotors to "ABL" and decipher the remaining 90 characters. Notice that the Enigma does not have numerals, punctuation, or umlauts. Numbers were spelled out. Most spaces were ignored; an "X" was used for a period. Umlauts used their alternative spelling with a trailing "e". Some abbreviations were used: a "Q" was used for "CH".

Marian Rejewski

Marian Rejewski was a mathematics student at Poznań University.  During that time, the Polish Cipher Bureau recruited Rejewski and some other mathematics students including Jerzy Różycki and Henryk Zygalski to take a Bureau-sponsored course on cryptology.  The Bureau later hired some of the students to work part-time at a local branch of Bureau.  Rejewski left Poznań to study mathematics at University of Göttingen, but after a year he returned to Poznań.  In September 1932, Rejewski, Różycki, and Zygalski went to Warsaw and started working for the Polish Cipher Bureau full-time.

During December 1932, Marian Rejewski was tasked by the Cipher Bureau to work on the German Enigma. The Bureau had attempted to break a few years earlier, but had failed.  Within a few weeks, Rejewski had discovered how to break the German Enigma cipher machine.  The German Enigma message procedures at the time used common but secret daily machine settings, but the procedures also had each code clerk choose a three-letter message key.  For example, a clerk might choose "ABL" as the message key.  The message key was used to set the initial position of the rotors when encrypting (or decrypting) the body of the message.  Choosing a different message key was a security measure: it avoided having all the day's messages sent using the same polyalphabetic key which would have made the messages vulnerable to a polyalphabetic attack.  However, the sender needed to communicate the message key to the recipient in order for the recipient to decrypt the message.  The message key was first encrypted using the day's Grundstellung (a secret initial position of the Enigma's rotors, e.g., "FOL").

Communications were sometimes garbled, and if the message key were garbled, then the recipient would not be able to decrypt the message.  Consequently, the Germans took the precaution of sending the message key twice; if there was a garble, the recipient should be able to find the message key.  Here, the Germans committed a crucial error.  Instead of sending the encrypted message key (e.g., "PKP") twice to get "PKP PKP", the Germans doubled the message key (e.g., "ABL ABL"), encrypted the doubled key to get ("PKP JXI"), and sent the encrypted doubled key.  That mistake allowed Rejewski to identify six sequential permutations of the Enigma and exploit the knowledge they encrypted the same message key.

With the help of a commercial Enigma machine, some German materials obtained by French spy Hans Thilo-Schmidt, and German cipher clerks who would choose weak keys, Rejewki was able to reverse engineer the wiring of the Enigma's rotors and reflector.  The Polish Cipher Bureau then built several Polish Enigma doubles that could be used to decipher German messages.

Characteristic
The German procedure that sent an encrypted doubled key was the mistake that gave Rejewski a way in.  Rejewski viewed the Enigma as permuting the plaintext letters into ciphertext.  For each character position in a message, the machine used a different permutation.  Let A B C D E F be the respective permutations for the first through sixth letters.  Rejewski knew the first and fourth letters were the same, the second and fifth letters were the same, and third and sixth letters were the same.  Rejewski could then examine the day's message traffic; with enough traffic he could piece together the composed permutations.

For example, for the daily key in a 1930 technical manual, then (with enough messages) Rejewski could find the following characteristics:

The notation is Cauchy's cycle notation. By examining the day's traffic, Rejewski would notice that if "p" were the first letter of the indicator, then "j" would be the fourth letter.  On another indicator, "j" would be the first letter, and "x" would be the fourth letter.  Rejewski would continue following the letters.  Eventually, there would be a message whose first letter was "y" and the fourth letter would cycle back to "p".  The same observations would be done for the second and fifth letters; usually there would be several cycles.

Grill method

Rejewski could use this cycle information and some sloppy habits of code clerks to figure out the individual permutations A B C D E F using the grill method, but that method was tedious.  After using the grill, the Poles would know the rightmost rotor and its position, the plugboard connections, and Q (the permutation of the reflector and other two rotors).  In order to get the daily key, the Poles would still have a lot of work to do, and that work could entail trying all possible orders and positions for the two left rotors to find the position for the Grundstellung. The Poles started using a Q-catalog to make part of the grill method easier; that catalog had 4,056 entries (26 × 26 × 6). To find the ring settings, the grill method could require trying 17,576 possibilities.

The grill method worked well until 1 October 1936, the day the Germans stopped using six steckers (plugboard connections) and started using five to eight steckers.  More steckers could frustrate the grill method.

The Poles looked for another attack, and they settled on another catalog method.  There were only 105,456 individual permutations that the Poles considered (the Poles ignored cases where the two left drums moved while encrypting the indicator).  If the Poles had a catalog of those permutations, then they could look up the rotor order and rotor positions.  Unfortunately, the Cauchy cycle notation is not suitable.  The cycle notation for AD could be put in a canonical alphabetical order to serve as a key, but that key would be different for each of the 7 trillion possible plugboard settings.

Cycle lengths
Instead of indexing the catalog by the actual cycles, the Poles hit upon indexing the catalog by the length of the cycles.  Although the plugboard changed the identity of the letters in the permutation, the plugboard did not change the lengths of the cycles.

It turns out there are 101 possible patterns for the cycle lengths of an indicator permutation.  With the three permutations in the characteristic, there are about one million possible cycle length combinations.  Consequently, the cycle lengths could be used as a hash function into a hash table of the 105,456 possible combinations.  The Poles would look at the day's traffic, recover the characteristic of the indicator, and then look in the card catalog.  The odds would be good that only one (or maybe a few) cards had those cycle lengths.

The result would be the appropriate rotor order and the positions of all the rotors without much work. The method was simpler than the grill method and would work when there were many steckers.

Recovering the plugboard
The catalog did not disclose the plugboard settings.  For six plugs (steckers), there are about 100 billion possible arrangements.  Trying them all out is infeasible.  However, the cryptographer could find the characteristic for that rotor order without a plugboard, use that bare characteristic in a known plaintext attack, and then determine the plugboard settings by comparing them with the daily characteristic.

From some daily traffic, the cryptanalyst would calculate the characteristic.

In the grill method, the above characteristic would be solved for the individual permutations  and then a laborious search would be done. Instead, the characteristic's paired cycle lengths would be calculated:
AD: 13
BE: 10 3
CF: 10 2 1
Those lengths would be looked up in the card catalog, and an entry would be found that would state the wheel order (II, I, III) and the initial position of each wheel.

The card catalog did not include the actual characteristic: the cyclometer only indicated membership in a cycle; it did not specify the order of letters in a cycle. After finding a catalog entry, the cryptanalyst would then calculate the characteristic without steckers (just the catalog settings). The cryptanalyst can determine each of the individual permutations  by setting an Enigma to the given wheel order and initial positions. The cryptanalyst then presses a and holds it down; the corresponding lamp lights and is written down; without releasing the first letter, the cryptanalyst presses b and then releases the first letter; that keeps the machine from advancing the rotors and lights the lamp corresponding to b. The cyptanalyst recovers the unsteckered characteristic:

The two characteristics are then used to solve the stecker permutation .

For this example, there are six steckers, and they would affect 12 characters. Looking at the  cycles, the plugboard cycles  must transpose with the un-steckered cycles . None of the letters are same, so all of those eight letters are steckered. Thus ten of the twelve steckered letters are quickly identified. Most of the other 16 letters, such as "b", "d", "g", and "l", are probably not steckered. (The initial letter of a cycle's notation is not significant: within a cycle, the letters must keep the same sequence, but they may be rotated.

At this point, the potential steckers can be read from the differences in the first two lines; they can also be checked for interchange consistency. The result is
P-S T-U W-Z N-V A-M F-I
These steckers match the 1930 Enigma example.

The only remaining secret is the ring positions (Ringstellung).

Building the catalog
The cyclometer was used to prepare a catalog of the length and number of cycles in the "characteristics" for all 17,576 positions of the rotors for a given sequence of rotors.  Since there were six such possible sequences, the resulting "catalog of characteristics," or "card catalog," comprised a total of (6) (17,576) = 105,456 entries.  

The utility of the card catalog, writes Rejewski, was independent of the number of plug connections being used by the Germans on their Enigma machines (and of the reconstruction of message keys). Preparation of the catalog "was laborious and took over a year, but when it was ready... daily keys [could be obtained] within about fifteen minutes."

On November 1, 1937, however, the Germans changed the "reversing drum," or "reflector."  This forced the Cipher Bureau to start anew with a new card catalog, "a task," writes Rejewski, "which consumed, on account of our greater experience, probably somewhat less than a year's time."

But then, on September 15, 1938, the Germans changed entirely the procedure for enciphering message keys, and as a result the card-catalog method became completely useless.
This spurred the invention of Rejewski's cryptologic bomb and Zygalski's perforated sheets.

See also 

 Cryptologic bomb:  a  machine designed about October 1938 by Marian Rejewski to facilitate the retrieval of Enigma keys.
 Bombe:  a machine, inspired by Rejewski's "(cryptologic) bomb," that was used by British and American cryptologists during World War II.
 Cryptanalysis of the Enigma and Enigma machine.
 Zygalski sheets:  invented about October 1938 by Henryk Zygalski and called "perforated sheets" by the Poles, they made possible the recovery of the Enigma's entire cipher key.

Notes

References
Władysław Kozaczuk, Enigma:  How the German Machine Cipher Was Broken, and How It Was Read by the Allies in World War Two, edited and translated by Christopher Kasparek, Frederick, MD, University Publications of America, 1984, .
 
Marian Rejewski, "Summary of Our Methods for Reconstructing ENIGMA and Reconstructing Daily Keys, and of German Efforts to Frustrate Those Methods," Appendix C to Władysław Kozaczuk, Enigma: How the German Machine Cipher Was Broken, and How It Was Read by the Allies in World War Two, 1984, pp. 241–45.
Marian Rejewski, "The Mathematical Solution of the Enigma Cipher," Appendix E to Władysław Kozaczuk, Enigma: How the German Machine Cipher Was Broken, and How It Was Read by the Allies in World War Two, 1984, pp. 272–91.

External links
 "Polish Enigma Double"
 About the Enigma (National Security Agency) 
 "The Enigma Code Breach" by Jan Bury 
 The „Enigma” and the Intelligence
 "Codebreaking and Secret Weapons in World War II" By Bill Momsen 
 A Brief History of Computing Technology, 1930 to 1939
 

Science and technology in Poland
Cipher Bureau (Poland)